Black Beat (블랙 비트) was a South Korean boy band formed by SM Entertainment. The five-member group released an album Volume 1 - Black Beat #2002 in 2002. They have not promoted as a group since SM Town 2006. Several members are active as choreographers and vocal trainers for other SM Entertainment artists. In 2007, lead vocalist Jang Jin-young teamed up with Kim Sung-pil to form the R&B duo, ByJinSung.

Black Beat was originally planned to be formed as a seven-member group before they debuted in 2000. They debuted as a five-member group during Lee Ji-hun's Dream Concert 2000 as back-up vocalists and dancers. Before 2002, Black Beat members performed as rappers and dancers for other artists. They have all performed as dancers for S.E.S.' "Dreams Come True" performances.

Performing with other artists
After joining SM Entertainment, Black Beat has appeared in many music videos and performances for other artists, mainly S.E.S. Other artists include BoA, H.O.T., Shinhwa, Fly to the Sky, Shinvi, Dana, and Lee Ji-hun as dancers, backup vocals, choreographers, and rappers. A video clip of member Jae-won dancing with Hyoyeon, a member of girl group Girls' Generation, has also garnered a lot of attention. .

Former members
 Lee So-min (이소민)
 Hwang Sang-hoon (황상훈)
 Jung Ji-hoon (정지훈)
 Shim Jae-won (심재원)
 Jang Jin-young (장진영)

Appearances in music videos
All five members (dancers)
Shinhwa's "All Your Dreams"
Yoo Hyun-jae, Jung Ji Hun, Hwang Sang Hun, and Shim Jae-won (dancers)
BoA's "ID Peace B"
BoA's "Sara"
Yoo Hyun-jae (dancer) and Shim Jae-won (rapper)
S.E.S.' "Twilight Zone"
Yoo Hyun-jae (dancer)
S.E.S.' "I love you"
Shim Jae-won (as a thief; dancer)
H.O.T.'s "We Are the Future"
TVXQ's "Why (Keep Your Head Down)"
TVXQ's "I Don't Know"
TVXQ's "Superstar"
BoA's "Only One"
Jang Jin-young (as the younger Jun Jin)
Shinhwa's "Wedding March"
Shinhwa's "All Your Dream" (Both Original & 2018 Remake Alongside M.I.L.K Bomi)

Discography
 Volume 1 - Black Beat #2002 - The First Performance #001 (November 3, 2002)
 Intro (Can't You Feel)
 The Fan
 날개 (Wing)
 Lover
 In The Sky
 Black Beat
 Dangerous
 회상
 Y (Tell Me Why)
 헤어지기전
 Shine
 Night Fever
 친구 (Friend)
 In The Sky (Radio Edited) (Bonus Track

Joint discography
Summer Vacation in SMTown.com June 10, 2002
2002 Winter Vacation in SMTown.com - My Angel My Light December 6, 2002
2003 Summer Vacation in SMTown.com June 18, 2003
2004 Summer Vacation in SMTown.com July 2, 2004
2006 Summer SMTown June 20, 2006
2006 Winter SMTown - Snow Dream December 12, 2006

Awards

References

External links 
 Black Beat Official Site 
 SM Entertainment's Official Site 
 Black Beat on empas people 

K-pop music groups
Musical groups disestablished in 2007
Musical groups established in 2002
South Korean boy bands
SM Town
SM Entertainment artists
2002 establishments in South Korea
Musical groups from Seoul
MAMA Award winners